The Armenian Mesrobian School is a K-12 Armenian school located in Pico Rivera, California, in the Los Angeles metropolitan area.

The board of trustees of the school includes officials from the school itself and the Holy Cross Armenian Apostolic Cathedral in Montebello. The school is affiliated with the church. The school serves the Armenian community east of Downtown Los Angeles, including those in Pico Rivera, Montebello, and Whittier.

Mesrobian offers a comprehensive educational program, accredited by the Western Association of Schools and Colleges, to students ranging from early childhood education through twelfth grade. The college preparatory high school classes are certified to the University of California, and honors or Advanced Placement classes are offered in Armenian, English, mathematics, science, and social sciences. David Ghoogasian is the school's principal.

Academics and curriculum
Armenian current events, history, and literature are elements of the classes taught at this school. Current events and history classes are taught in the Armenian language. Even students not of Armenian origins are required to take Armenian classes. As of 1993 over 90% of the school's students pursue higher education.

Demographics
As of 1993 there were 370 students. Of the students 359 were of Armenian origin, and 11 were not of Armenian origin.

As of 1993 there were 31 teachers. 25 were of Armenian origin and 6 were not of Armenian origin.

Athletics 
Mesrobian Varsity teams have been recognized for their athletic prominence.  Mesrobian is a member of the California Interscholastic Federation (CIF) and plays in the International League of the CIF Southern Section.  Before joining the International League in 1999, Mesrobian played in the Valley League.  Mesrobian has won league championships in boys' and girls' basketball, girls' volleyball, and boys' soccer.  Mesrobian, the first Armenian High School in the United States, has won dozens of academic and sportsmanship accolades since its opening in 1965.

The school's physical education program includes Armenian folk dance.

See also
 History of the Armenian Americans in Los Angeles

References

External links 

Armenian-American private schools
Private K-12 schools in Los Angeles County, California
Pico Rivera, California
Armenian-American culture in California
1965 establishments in California
Educational institutions established in 1965